Wheeling Township is one of the sixteen townships of Belmont County, Ohio, United States. The 2010 census recorded 1,691 people in the township.

Geography
Located in the northern part of the county, it borders the following townships:
Short Creek Township, Harrison County - north
Mount Pleasant Township, Jefferson County - northeast corner
Colerain Township - east
Richland Township - southeast
Union Township - southwest
Flushing Township - west
Athens Township, Harrison County - northwest

No municipalities are located in Wheeling Township, although the unincorporated community of Fairpoint lies in the township's east.

Name and history
Wheeling Township was organised in 1808. Wheeling Township took its name from its largest waterway, Wheeling Creek. From its source west of Lafferty and south of Flushing, Wheeling Creek winds along the southern regions of Wheeling Township, through and near communities such as Oco, Bannock, Crabapple, Flushing and Blainesville. Wheeling Creek has several tributary creeks that flow through the township, including Crabapple Creek, which begins just west of the township's boundary, Campbell Run, a tributary of Crabapple Creek, McCracken Run, meeting Wheeling Creek in Fairpoint, Love's Run, whose confluence is just east of Fairpoint and Cox Run, which flows into the creek in Blainesville.

Wheeling Township was known for its large production of wheat, which was processed by one of the many gristmills that once existed, and shipped to New Orleans.

Statewide, the only other Wheeling Township is located in Guernsey County.

Government
The township is governed by a three-member board of trustees, who are elected in November of odd-numbered years to a four-year term beginning on the following 1 January. Two are elected in the year after the presidential election and one is elected in the year before it. There is also an elected township fiscal officer, who serves a four-year term beginning on 1 April of the year after the election, which is held in November of the year before the presidential election. Vacancies in the fiscal officership or on the board of trustees is filled by the remaining trustees.

References

External links
County website

Townships in Belmont County, Ohio
Townships in Ohio
1808 establishments in Ohio